Pavlic, Pavlić and Pavlič are South Slavic surnames. They may refer to:

 Pavlić:
 Pavlić (family), a Ragusan noble family from the city of Dubrovnik
 Đorđe Pavlić (1938–2015), Serbian football striker
 Pavlič:
 Jure Pavlič, Yugoslav cyclist 
 Pavlic:
 Jurica Pavlic, Croatian speedway rider
 Milton F. Pavlic (1909–1942), United States Navy officer